is a Japanese politician and member of the House of Representatives. She is a member of the Liberal Democratic Party.

She was born in Shinagawa, Tokyo and received an LLB from the University of Tokyo, following which she joined the Ministry of International Trade and Industry. She attended business school at Columbia University and subsequently worked in the Cabinet Secretariat under Prime Minister Junichiro Koizumi, as a management consultant with Boston Consulting Group, and as a marketing executive for Hermès Japan.

She was first elected to the Diet in the 2012 general election, in which she defeated former Economy Minister (and subsequent Democratic Party of Japan president) Banri Kaieda in the Tokyo 1st district. Her campaign was supported by Kaoru Yosano.

Miki was re-elected to serve a further term in parliament in the 2014 general election. She was appointed (and remains) Vice-minister for foreign affairs in the 3rd cabinet re-shuffle of the Abe administration.

In the 2017 general election, Kaieda defeated Yamada by a small margin in the Tokyo 1st district, but Yamada retained a seat in the Diet through the LDP proportional representation list.

References

External links 
 

1974 births
People from Shinagawa
Living people
Boston Consulting Group people
Columbia Business School alumni
Female members of the House of Representatives (Japan)
Japanese management consultants
Liberal Democratic Party (Japan) politicians
Members of the House of Representatives from Tokyo
Politicians from Tokyo
University of Tokyo alumni
21st-century Japanese women politicians
21st-century Japanese politicians